Palazzo Duodo is a Gothic-style palace on the Canal Grande, located between the Ca' Tron and the Palazzo Priuli Bon, in the sestiere of Santa Croce, in Venice, Italy. There is a second Palazzo Duodo a Campo Sant'Angelo.

The palace was built in the 15th century. In 1712 it was let to Marchese Orazio Lancilotti, and in 1740 there were several tenants. In 1808 it belonged to Carlo Duodo of S. Maria Zobenigo

References

Houses completed in the 15th century
Duodo
Duodo
Gothic architecture in Venice